Zürich ware is a type of porcelain that was made in Zürich, Switzerland. The factory was produced was founded in 1763 by Salomon Gessner.

The factory produced a mixture of faience (tin-glazed pottery) and faience fine (lead-glazed earthenware) alongside the more traditional Zürich ware.

Porcelain
1763 establishments in Europe
18th-century establishments in the Old Swiss Confederacy